Abies balsamea or balsam fir is a North American fir, native to most of eastern and central Canada (Newfoundland west to central Alberta) and the northeastern United States (Minnesota east to Maine, and south in the Appalachian Mountains to West Virginia).

Description 
The narrow conic crown consists of dense, dark-green leaves. The bark on young trees is smooth, grey, and with resin blisters (which tend to spray when ruptured), becoming rough and fissured or scaly on old trees. They are arranged spirally on the shoot, but with the leaf bases twisted so that the leaves appear to be in two more-or-less horizontal rows on either side of the shoot. The needles become shorter and thicker the higher they are on the tree.

Medicinal 
For thousands of years Native Americans used Balsam fir for medicinal and therapeutic purposes. The needles are digested directly off the tree by many animals and humans. Higher content dosage is ingested in tea. Balsam Fir contains vitamin C, which has been studied for its effects on bacterial and viral infections.

Reproduction 
The male reproductive organs generally develop more rapidly and appear sooner than the female organs. The male organs contain microsporangia which divide to form sporogenous tissue, composed of cells which become archesporial cells. These develop into microspores, or pollen-mother cells, once they are rounded and filled with starch grains. When the microspores undergo meiosis in the spring, four haploid microspores are produced which eventually become pollen grains. Once the male strobilus has matured the microsporangia are exposed at which point the pollen is released.

The female megasporangiate is larger than the male. It contains bracts and megasporophylls, each of which contains two ovules, arranged in a spiral. These then develop a nucellus in which a mother cell is formed. Meiosis occurs and a megaspore is produced as the first cell of the megagametophyte. As cell division takes place the nucleus of the megaspore thickens, and cell differentiation occurs to produce prothallial tissue containing an ovum. The remaining undifferentiated cells then form the endosperm.

When the male structure releases its pollen grains, some fall onto the female strobilus and reach the ovule. At this point the pollen tube begins to generate, and eventually the sperm and egg meet at which point fertilization occurs.

Varieties 
There are two varieties:
 Abies balsamea var. balsamea (balsam fir) – bracts subtending seed scales short, not visible on the closed cones. Most of the species' range.
 Abies balsamea var. phanerolepis (bracted balsam fir or Canaan fir) – bracts subtending seed scales longer, visible on the closed cone. The southeast of the species' range, from southernmost Quebec to West Virginia. The name Canaan fir derives from one of its native localities, the Canaan Valley in West Virginia. Some botanists regard this variety as a natural hybrid between balsam fir and Fraser fir (Abies fraseri), which occurs further south in the Appalachian mountains.

Ecology 

They typically grow in the following four forest types:
 Swamp – swamp forest types never completely dry out, so balsam firs have constant access to water. The ground is covered in sphagnum and other mosses. In swamps, balsam firs grow densely and slowly, and are slender.
 Flat – sometimes referred to as "dry swamps," these areas are better drained than swamps but still retain moisture well. Fern moss covers the ground and there is a possibility of ground rot. In flat areas balsam fir grows fast, tall, and large, mixed with red spruce.
 Hardwood slope – ground rot is common in this well-drained area, and leaf litter covers the forest floor. Balsam firs grow fast, tall, and large along with big hardwood trees such as yellow birch, sugar maple and beech.
 Mountain top – On mountain tops, stands of balsam fir occasionally develop fir waves. The development is similar to that in swamps with slow growth resulting in slender, short trees. Some of the low branches touch the ground, and may grow roots to produce an independent tree.

The foliage is browsed by moose and deer. The seeds are eaten by American red squirrels, grouse, and pine mice; the tree also provides food for crossbills and chickadees, as well as shelter for moose, snowshoe hares, white-tailed deer, ruffed grouse, and other small mammals and songbirds. The needles are eaten by some lepidopteran caterpillars, for example the Io moth (Automeris io).

Conservation Status
It is listed as endangered in Connecticut. This status applies to native populations only.

Pests 
The balsam fir is the preferred main host of the eastern spruce budworm, which is a major destructive pest throughout the eastern United States and Canada. During cyclical population outbreaks, major defoliation of the balsam fir can occur, which may significantly reduce radial growth. This can kill the tree. An outbreak in Quebec in 1957 killed over 75% of balsam fir in some stands.

The needles of balsam fir can be infected by the fungus Delphinella balsameae.

Cultivation

Christmas trees

Both varieties of the species are very popular as Christmas trees, particularly in the northeastern United States. Balsam firs cut for Christmas are not taken from the forest, but are grown on large plantations. The balsam fir is one of the greatest exports of Quebec and New England. It is celebrated for its rich green needles, natural conical shape, and needle retention after being cut, and it is notably the most fragrant of all Christmas tree varieties.

Many of these plantations are family farms handed down from generation to generation. The techniques of shearing, growing, and other cultivation secretly passed down from grandparents to grandchildren. Families like the Rousseau's of Quebec, Rose of New Brunswick, and Kessler's (North Pole Xmas Trees) of New Hampshire have kept family traditions for almost a century.

The balsam fir was used six times for the US Capitol Christmas Tree between 1964 and 2019.

In northern areas of Minnesota, Michigan, and Wisconsin balsam fir branches (boughs) are used to make Christmas wreaths.

Horticulture
Abies balsamea is also grown as an ornamental tree for parks and gardens. It does not bear cones. It has gained the Royal Horticultural Society's Award of Garden Merit.

Other cultivars include:-

 ‘Angustata’
 'Argentea'
 'Brachylepis'
 'Coerulea'
 'Columnaris'
 'Glauca'
 'Globosa'
 'Longifolia'
 'Lutescens'
 'Macrocarpa'
 'Marginata'
 'Nana'
 'Nudicaulis'
 'Paucifolia'
 'Prostrata'
 'Pyramidalis'
 'Variegata'
 'Versicolor'  Other uses 

The resin is used to produce Canada balsam, and was traditionally used as a cold remedy and as a glue for glasses, optical instrument components, and for preparing permanent mounts of microscope specimens. Given its use as a traditional remedy and the relatively high ascorbic acid content of its needles, historian Jacques Mathieu has argued that the balsam fir was the "aneda" that cured scurvy during the second expedition into Canada of Jacques Cartier. The wood is milled for framing lumber (part of SPF lumber), siding and pulped for paper manufacture. Balsam fir oil is an EPA approved nontoxic rodent repellent. The balsam fir is also used as an air freshener and as incense.

Prior to the availability of foam rubber and air mattresses, balsam fir boughs were a preferred mattress in places where trees greatly outnumbered campers. Many fir limbs are vertically bowed from alternating periods of downward deformation from snow loading and new growth reaching upward for sunlight. Layers of inverted freshly cut limbs from small trees created a pleasantly fragrant mattress lifting bedding off the wet ground; and the bowed green limbs were springs beneath the soft needles. Upper layers of limbs were placed with the cut ends of the limbs touching the earth to avoid uncomfortably sharp spots and sap.

Native American ethnobotany
The Native Americans use it for a variety of medicinal purposes.

The Abenaki use the gum for slight itches and as an antiseptic ointment. They stuff the leaves, needles and wood into pillows as a panacea.

The Algonquin people of Quebec apply a poultice of the gum to open sores, insect bites, boils and infections, use the needles as a sudatory for women after childbirth and for other purposes, use the roots for heart disease, use the needles to make a laxative tea, and use the needles for making poultices.

The Atikamekw chew the sap as a cold remedy, and use the boughs as mats for the tent floor.

The Cree use the pitch for menstrual irregularity, and take an infusion of the bark and sometimes the wood for coughs. They use the pitch and grease used as an ointment for scabies and boils. They apply a poultice of pitch applied to cuts. They also use a decoction of pitch and sturgeon oil used for tuberculosis, and take an infusion of bark for tuberculosis. They also use the boughs to make brush shelters and use the wood to make paddles.

The Innu people grate the inner bark and eat it to benefit their diet.

The Iroquois use a steam from a decoction of branches as a bath for rheumatism and parturition, and ingest a decoction of the plant for rheumatism. They take a compound decoction for colds and coughs, sometimes mixing it with alcohol. They apply a compound decoction of the plant for cuts, sprains, bruises and sores. They apply a poultice of the gum and dried beaver kidneys for cancer. They also take a compound decoction in the early stages of tuberculosis, and they use the plant for bedwetting and gonorrhea.

The Maliseet use the juice of the plant as a laxative, use the pitch in medicines, and use an infusion of the bark, sometimes mixed with spruce and tamarack bark, for gonorrhea. They use the needles and branches as pillows and bedding, the roots as thread, and use the pitch to waterproof seams in canoes.

The Menominee use the inner bark as a seasoner for medicines, take an infusion of the inner bark for chest pain, and use the liquid balsam pressed from the trunk for colds and pulmonary troubles. They also use the inner bark as a poultice for unspecified illnesses. They also apply gum from plant blisters to sores.

The Miꞌkmaq use a poultice of inner bark for an unspecified purpose, use the buds, cones and inner bark for diarrhea, use the gum for burns, colds, fractures, sores and wounds, use the cones for colic, and use the buds as a laxative. They also use the bark used for gonorrhea and buds used as a laxative. They use the boughs to make beds, use the bark to make a beverage, and use the wood for kindling and fuel.

The Ojibwe melt the gum on warm stones and inhale the fumes for headache. They also use a decoction of the root as an herbal steam for rheumatic joints. They also combine the gum with bear's grease and use it as an ointment for hair. 
They use the needle-like leaves in as part of ceremony involving the sweat bath, and use the gum for colds and inhale the leaf smoke for colds. They use the plant as a cough medicine. The gum is used for sores and a compound containing leaves is used as wash. The liquid balsam from bark blisters is used for sore eyes. They boil the resin twice and add it to suet or fat to make a canoe pitch. The bark gum is taken for chest soreness from colds, applied to cuts and sores, and decoction of the bark is used to induce sweating. The bark gum is also taken for gonorrhea.

The Penobscot smear the sap over sores, burns, and cuts.

The Potawatomi use the needles to make pillows, believing that the aroma prevented one from getting a cold. They also use the balsam gum as a salve for sores, and take an infusion of the bark for tuberculosis and other internal afflictions.

 Tree emblem 
Balsam fir is the provincial tree of New Brunswick.

 See also 
 Balsam of Peru
 Fraser fir

 Gallery 

 References 

Further reading
 
 Karen Legasy, Shayna LaBelle-Beadman & Brenda Chambers. Forest Plants of Northeastern Ontario''. Lone Pine Publishing / Queen's Printer for Ontario, 1995.

External links 

 Gymnosperm Database: Abies balsamea
 Winter ID pictures
 Compiled images
 Interactive Distribution Map of Abies balsamea
 Conifer Database

balsamea
Flora of Eastern Canada
Flora of Western Canada
Trees of the Northeastern United States
Trees of the North-Central United States
Trees of the Great Lakes region (North America)
Plants used in traditional Native American medicine
Trees of humid continental climate
Least concern plants
Provincial symbols of New Brunswick
Plants described in 1753
Taxa named by Carl Linnaeus
Least concern flora of the United States
Taxa named by Philip Miller